During the 2002–03 English football season, Wigan Athletic F.C. competed in the Football League Second Division.

Season summary
After considerable investment into the team, Wigan won promotion to the second tier of English football by winning the Second Division with 100 points, 14 clear of runners-up Crewe. It was their highest-ever finish in the Football League.

In the Carling Cup, Wigan reached the quarter finals with wins over Premiership sides West Bromwich Albion (3–1 at home, second round), Manchester City (1–0 at home, third round) and Fulham (2–1 at home, fourth round) before being knocked out by Blackburn Rovers after a 2–0 home loss.

Squad

Left club during season

References

2002-03
Wigan Athletic